Unforgiven is a 1992 American Western film starring, directed, and produced by Clint Eastwood, and written by David Webb Peoples. The film tells the story of William Munny, an aging outlaw and killer who takes on one more job, years after he had turned to farming. The film co-stars Gene Hackman, Morgan Freeman, and Richard Harris.

Unforgiven grossed over $159 million on a budget of $14.4 million and received widespread critical acclaim, with praise for the acting (particularly from Eastwood and Hackman), directing, editing, themes and cinematography. The film won four Academy Awards: Best Picture and Best Director for Clint Eastwood, Best Supporting Actor for Gene Hackman, and Best Film Editing for editor Joel Cox. Eastwood was nominated for the Academy Award for Best Actor for his performance, but he lost to Al Pacino for Scent of a Woman. The film was the third Western to win Best Picture, following Cimarron (1931) and Dances with Wolves (1990). Eastwood dedicated the film to directors and mentors Sergio Leone and Don Siegel.

In 2004, Unforgiven was selected for preservation in the United States National Film Registry by the Library of Congress as being deemed "culturally, historically, or aesthetically significant". The film was remade into a 2013 Japanese film, also titled Unforgiven, which stars Ken Watanabe and changes the setting to the early Meiji era in Japan. Eastwood has long asserted that the film would be his last traditional Western, concerned that any future projects would simply rehash previous plotlines or imitate someone else's work.

Plot
In 1881, in Big Whiskey, Wyoming, a cowboy—Quick Mike—slashes prostitute Delilah Fitzgerald's face with a knife, permanently disfiguring her, after she laughs at his small penis. As punishment, sheriff "Little Bill" Daggett orders Mike and his associate who was with him at the brothel, David "Davey" Bunting, to turn over several of their horses to her employer, Skinny DuBois, for his loss of revenue. Outraged, the prostitutes offer a $1,000 bounty for the cowboys' deaths.

In Hodgeman County, Kansas, a boastful young man calling himself the "Schofield Kid" visits Will Munny's hog farm, claiming to be an experienced bounty hunter looking for help pursuing the cowboys. Formerly a notorious outlaw and murderer, Will is now a repentant widower raising two children. After initially refusing to help, Will realizes that his farm is failing and that his children's future is in jeopardy. He recruits his friend Ned Logan, another retired outlaw, and they catch up with the Kid, who they discover is severely near-sighted.

Back in Big Whiskey, British-born gunfighter "English" Bob, an old acquaintance and rival of Little Bill, seeks the bounty. He arrives in town with his biographer W. W. Beauchamp, who naively believes Bob's exaggerated tales. Enforcing the town's anti-gun law, Little Bill and his deputies disarm Bob, and the sheriff beats him savagely to discourage others from attempting to claim the bounty. Little Bill humiliates Bob and banishes him from town the next morning, but Beauchamp stays out of a fascination with the sheriff, who debunks many of the romantic notions Beauchamp has about the Wild West. Little Bill explains to Beauchamp that the best attribute for a gunslinger is to be cool-headed under fire, rather than to have the quickest draw, and to always kill the best shooter first.

Will, Ned and the Kid arrive in town during a rainstorm and head to Skinny's saloon. While Ned and the Kid meet with the prostitutes upstairs, Little Bill confronts a feverish Will. Not realizing Will's identity but correctly guessing that he wants the bounty, Bill confiscates his pistol and beats him. Ned and the Kid escape through a back window and take Will to an unoccupied barn outside of town, where they nurse him back to health. A few days later the trio ambush Davey. After missing Davey and hitting his horse, Ned falters and Will shoots Davey instead. Ned decides to quit and sets off back to Kansas.

Ned is later captured and flogged to death by Little Bill while trying to learn the whereabouts of Will and the kid. Will takes the Kid with him to the cowboys' ranch, directing him to ambush Quick Mike in the outhouse and shoot him. After they escape, a distraught Kid drunkenly confesses he had never killed anyone before and is overcome with remorse. A prostitute arrives with the reward and tells them about Ned’s fate. Shocked by the news, Will begins drinking and demands the Kid's revolver. The Kid hands it over, saying that he no longer wants to be a killer, and Will sends him back to Kansas to distribute the reward.

That night, Will finds Ned's corpse displayed in a coffin outside Skinny's saloon as a warning to bounty hunters. Inside, Little Bill and his deputies are organizing a posse. Will walks in alone brandishing a shotgun and kills Skinny for displaying Ned's corpse. He then takes aim at Little Bill, only for the shotgun to misfire. In the ensuing gunfight Will uses the revolver to wound Little Bill and four deputies. He then orders the rest of the posse out. Beauchamp lingers briefly to ask how Will survived; Will replies that it was luck and scares him away. Little Bill tries and fails to take another shot while lying on the floor, then bemoans his fate and curses Will, who shoots him dead. As he leaves Big Whiskey, Will warns the townsfolk that he will return if Ned is not buried properly or if any more prostitutes are harmed.

A closing title card states that Will's mother-in-law found his farm abandoned years later, Will having possibly moved to San Francisco, and she remained at a loss to understand why her daughter married a notorious outlaw and murderer.

Cast

Production
The film was written by David Webb Peoples, who had written the Oscar nominated film The Day After Trinity and co-written Blade Runner with Hampton Fancher. The concept for the film dated to 1976, when it was developed under the titles The Cut-Whore Killings and The William Munny Killings. By Eastwood's own recollection, he was given the script in the "early 80s" although he did not immediately pursue it, because, according to him, "I thought I should do some other things first". Eastwood personally phoned Harris to offer him the role of English Bob, and later said Harris was watching Eastwood's movie High Plains Drifter at the time of the phone call, leading to Harris thinking it was a prank.

Filming took place between August 26, 1991 and November 12, 1991. Much of the cinematography for the film was shot in Alberta in August 1991 by director of photography Jack Green. Production designer Henry Bumstead, who had worked with Eastwood on High Plains Drifter, was hired to create the "drained, wintry look" of the western. The railroad scenes were filmed on the Sierra Railroad in Tuolumne County, California.

Themes
Like other Revisionist Westerns, Unforgiven is primarily concerned with deconstructing the morally black-and-white vision of the American West that was established by traditional works in the genre, as David Webb Peoples’ script is saturated with unnerving reminders of Munny's own horrific past as a murderer and gunfighter haunted by the lives he's taken, while the film as a whole "reflects a reverse image of classical Western tropes": the protagonists, rather than avenging a God-fearing innocent, are hired to collect a bounty for a group of prostitutes. Men who claim to be fearless killers are either exposed as cowards and weaklings or self-promoting liars, while others find that they no longer have it in them to take another life. A writer with no conception of the harshness and cruelty of frontier life publishes stories that glorify common criminals as infallible men of honor. The law is represented by a pitiless and cynical former gunslinger whose idea of justice is often swift and without mercy, and while the main protagonist initially tries to resist his violent impulses, the murder of his friend drives him to become the same cold-blooded killer he once was, suggesting that a Western hero is not necessarily "the good guy", but rather "just the one who survived".

"The law" as represented by the Sheriff, Little Bill, is set against "the outlaw" represented by Munny. Becoming an outlaw in this case involves citizens sentencing two men to death for an assault with a knife, even after the law has sentenced them. The attackers' subsequent murders are in cold blood and sicken two of the three killers, Ned and The Kid, to the extent both decide they are done with killing. The motivation for the murders is money, not a sense of justice. Only after Ned is accidentally killed during questioning and this is relayed to Munny by one of the prostitutes, does Munny seek revenge. He then kills five men - single handed - while admitting he has killed women and children before. The audience is left with a murderer taking revenge after murdering men for money as an apparent hero, while a Sheriff who attempts to keep law and order is a villain, playing with traditional roles. Unforgiven does not offer a singular set of moral guidelines that the protagonists follow and the antagonists disobey. Instead, each character acts on what they think is right for them, and they often act in both morally right and wrong ways. Munny gets justice for Delilah and avenges Ned, but despite his noble actions, Munny's character is haunted by his violent past, where he was notorious for killing any man, woman or child. Allen Redmon's "Mechanisms of Violence in Clint Eastwood's Unforgiven and Mystic River" describes Munny's role as an antihero by stating he is "a virtuous or an injured hero [that] overcomes all obstacles to see that evil is eradicated using whatever means necessary". Munny's repeated acts of killing, to accomplish what he sees as just, eventually cause him to fall into his old ways of being a man corrupted by violence. Other characters in the film such as Ned and the Schofield Kid disagree with Munny's methods of justice after they decide they can no longer live a life where they kill others. Munny is motivated to kill in order to earn the bounty for Quick Mike and Davey Bunting. Though he realizes killing is difficult, he ultimately decides to return to the life of a gunslinger in order to provide for his children, which he thinks is the morally responsible thing to do for him and his family.

Nonduality asks us to view good and evil as two parts of an undivided whole with good possessing evil and evil possessing good. This non-dualistic view is represented very well by the Chinese Dao symbol. In the movie, Will Munny views the world through a dualistic lens. Will sees every person that he comes across in a polarized way. And so when he aims to kill someone, he considers if they are good or bad, guilty or innocent, and there is no gray area through which to judge an entire person’s life. Little Bill killed Ned and so he must die. Quick Mike and Davey Bunting cut up Delilah and so they must die. Will’s worldview is as Durkheim describes when he writes "at all times, man himself has had a keen sense of this duality. Everywhere, indeed, he has conceived of himself as formed of two radically heterogeneous beings: the body, on the one hand, the soul on the other" (Durkheim, 2005). For Will the world is black and white and he is the judge and executioner.

Literary allusions
Unforgiven shares many parallels with Homer's Iliad, in characters and themes. "In both works, the protagonists-Achilles and William Munny are self-questioning warriors who temporarily reject the culture of violence only to return to it after the death of their closest male friend, in which they are implicated." Munny and Achilles have the same dilemma between fate and counter-fate. They know that their fate is being a warrior and likely dying that way, however they both try to reject it for at least some time. Munny continually claims he has changed and "ain’t like that no more" referring to his warrior-like hitman past, whereas Achilles continually refuses to be a soldier in the Greek army since he condemns Agamemnon for not stopping the war when he could have.

Neither wants to kill for causes from their past (Munny being an outlaw, Achilles being a warrior-king) since they find them unjust. Both are committed to a "higher" cause—Munny to his children and his wife’s wishes, and Achilles to the injustice of women-stealing and to Briseis, who at one point he would’ve had to sacrifice to Agamemnon to stop the war.

However, when their best friends are killed—Achilles’ Patroclus and Munny’s Ned—they allow their rage and desire for vengeance to make them return to their warrior-prescribed fate. Achilles rages against the Trojans and kills many. He gets vengeance by killing Hector and desecrating his corpse, dragging it around the town. Munny rages against Little Bill and his crew. He gets vengeance by killing them and Little Bill, threatening to kill anyone who opposes him.

There are however relevant differences in Homer's epic and Eastwood’s film, namely that Achilles is fated to die in battle, whereas Munny moves to California at the end of the film to become a businessman to provide for his kids. Whether Munny has successfully countered his warrior-fate is unclear, as is whether a life in dry goods redeems him as his love for his wife had done.

Reception

Box office
The film debuted at the top position in its opening weekend. Its earnings of $15 million ($7,252 average from 2,071 theaters) in its opening weekend was the best-ever opening for an Eastwood film at that time. It spent a total of three weeks as the No. 1 film in North America. In its 35th weekend (April 2–4, 1993), capitalizing on its Oscar wins, the film returned to the Top 10 (spending another three weeks total there), ranking at No. 8 with a gross of $2.5 million ($2,969 average from 855 theaters), an improvement of 197 percent over the weekend before where it made $855,188 ($1,767 average from 484 theaters). The film closed on July 15, 1993, having spent nearly a full year in theaters (343 days / 49 weeks), having earned $101.2 million in North America, and another $58 million internationally for a total of $159.2 million worldwide.

Critical response
Review aggregator Rotten Tomatoes reports an approval rating of 96% based on 108 reviews, and an average rating of 8.80/10. The website's critical consensus states: "As both director and star, Clint Eastwood strips away decades of Hollywood varnish applied to the Wild West, and emerges with a series of harshly eloquent statements about the nature of violence." Metacritic gave the film a score of 85 out of 100 based on 34 critics, indicating "universal acclaim". Audiences polled by CinemaScore gave the film an average grade of "B+" on an A+ to F scale.

Jack Methews of the Los Angeles Times described Unforgiven as "the finest classical western to come along since perhaps John Ford's 1956 The Searchers." Richard Corliss in Time wrote that the film was "Eastwood's meditation on age, repute, courage, heroism—on all those burdens he has been carrying with such grace for decades." Gene Siskel and Roger Ebert criticized the work, though the latter gave it a positive vote, for being too long and having too many superfluous characters (such as Harris' English Bob, who enters and leaves without meeting the protagonists). Despite his initial reservations, Ebert eventually included the film in his "The Great Movies" list.

Unforgiven was named one of the ten best films of the year on 76 critics' lists, according to a poll of the nation's top 106 film critics.

Accolades

American Film Institute recognition
In June 2008, Unforgiven was listed as the fourth best American film in the Western genre (behind The Searchers, High Noon, and Shane) in the American Film Institute's "AFI's 10 Top 10" list.
 AFI's 100 Years...100 Movies – #98
 AFI's 100 Years...100 Movies (10th Anniversary Edition) – #68

Legacy
The music for the Unforgiven film trailer, which appeared in theatres and on some of the DVDs, was composed by Randy J. Shams and Tim Stithem in 1992. The main theme song, "Claudia's Theme," was composed by Clint Eastwood.

The film was planned to be used as the theme for  Six Flags Great Adventure's then-upcoming roller coaster, but market research showed that people found it to be too dark of a theme, so the ride’s name was changed to Viper.

In 2004, Unforgiven was deemed "culturally, historically, or aesthetically significant" by the Library of Congress and was selected for preservation in the United States National Film Registry.

In 2013, the Writers Guild of America ranked Peoples' script for Unforgiven as the 30th greatest ever written.

Several story elements of the film are paralleled in "The Noblest of Men, and a Woman", a side-quest in the 2018 video game Red Dead Redemption 2, including an English Bob-like former gunfighter having his biography written by a naive journalist, the player having to visit an aging outlaw who runs a pig farm, the gunfighter revealing himself to be a complete fraud, a final shootout where the player kills him, and the journalist deciding to write a fictional account of the gunfighter's death that completely ignores the truth of what really happened.

Home media
Unforgiven was released as premium home video, on DVD and VHS, on September 24, 2002. It was released on Blu-ray Book (a Blu-ray Disc with book packaging) on February 21, 2012. Special features include an audio commentary by Clint Eastwood biographer Richard Schickel; four documentaries including "All on Accounta Pullin' a Trigger", "Eastwood & Co.: Making Unforgiven", "Eastwood...A Star", and "Eastwood on Eastwood", and more. Unforgiven was released on 4K UHD Blu-ray on May 16, 2017.

Remake

A Japanese adaptation of Unforgiven, directed by Lee Sang-il and starring Ken Watanabe, was released in 2013. The plot of the 2013 version is very similar to the original, but it takes place in Japan during the Meiji period, with the main character being a samurai instead of a bandit.

Notes

References

Bibliography

External links

 
 
 
 
 
 
 
 

 

1992 films
1992 Western (genre) films
1990s American films
1990s English-language films
American Western (genre) films
BAFTA winners (films)
Best Picture Academy Award winners
Films about atonement
Films about prostitution in the United States
American films about revenge
Existentialist films
Films directed by Clint Eastwood
Films featuring a Best Supporting Actor Academy Award-winning performance
Films featuring a Best Supporting Actor Golden Globe winning performance
Films produced by Clint Eastwood
Films scored by Lennie Niehaus
Films set in 1881
Films set in Wyoming
Films set in Kansas
Films shot in Alberta
Films shot in California
Films with screenplays by David Peoples
Films whose director won the Best Directing Academy Award
Films whose director won the Best Director Golden Globe
Films whose editor won the Best Film Editing Academy Award
Malpaso Productions films
Revisionist Western (genre) films
National Society of Film Critics Award for Best Film winners
United States National Film Registry films
Warner Bros. films